Sheila Abbey Finestone  (January 28, 1927 – June 8, 2009) was a Canadian Member of Parliament and Senator.

Early life
Born in Montreal, Quebec, the daughter of Minnie Cummings Abbey and Monroe Abbey. Her father was a president of the Canadian Jewish Congress. Finestone received a Bachelor of Science degree from McGill University in 1947. The same year, she married Alan Finestone (1923–1997). They had four sons: David (born 1950), Peter (born 1951), Maxwell (born 1954) and Stephen (born 1956).

Career
From 1977 to 1980, she was president of the Fédération des femmes du Québec. In 1984 she was elected as a Liberal Member of Parliament for the Montreal riding of Mount Royal. She was re-elected in the 1988, 1993 and 1997 elections.

Finestone was sworn to the Privy Council in November 1993 as Secretary of State (Multiculturalism and Status of Women). Finestone was appointed to the Senate of Canada in August 1999. She completed her term in the Senate in 2002 when she reached the mandatory retirement age of 75.

She was a member of the board of the Canadian Landmine Foundation.

In 2008, Finestone was the recipient of the Distinguished Service Award of the Canadian Association of Former Parliamentarians, "presented annually to a former parliamentarian who has made an outstanding contribution to the country and its democratic institutions." The award was accepted on her behalf by her son Peter, due to Finestone's inability to attend, following health challenges.

Death
Finestone died of cancer on June 8, 2009 in Ottawa.

References

External links

Jewish Women's Archive entry

1927 births
2009 deaths
Anglophone Quebec people
Canadian senators from Quebec
Women members of the House of Commons of Canada
Women members of the Senate of Canada
Deaths from cancer in Ontario
Jewish Canadian politicians
Liberal Party of Canada MPs
Liberal Party of Canada senators
McGill University alumni
Members of the 26th Canadian Ministry
Members of the House of Commons of Canada from Quebec
Members of the King's Privy Council for Canada
Politicians from Montreal
Women in Quebec politics
21st-century Canadian women politicians
20th-century Canadian women politicians
Women government ministers of Canada
Jewish women politicians